"Longing for Lullabies" is the second single from the Swedish producer and singer-songwriter Kleerup's first album. Following the success of "With Every Heartbeat", released a year before. The single was a top ten hit in Sweden, peaking at No. 7. The song has vocals from Swedish singer Titiyo.

Chart performance
In Sweden, "Longing for Lullabies" entered the official singles chart at No. 16, and climbed to its peak position of No. 7 in the following week, thus giving Kleerup his first domestic top 10 hit, and Titiyo's first top 10 since her 2001 single, "Come Along".

Track listing
 "Longing for Lullabies"
 "Longing for Lullabies" (John Dahlbäck Remix)
 "Tower of Trellick"

Charts

Weekly charts

References

2008 singles
Dance-pop songs
Number-one singles in Poland
Synth-pop ballads
Songs written by Kleerup
Titiyo songs
2008 songs
EMI Records singles